The CMLL Universal Championship (2016) was a professional wrestling tournament produced and scripted by Consejo Mundial de Lucha Libre (CMLL). The tournament took place from October 14, 2016 and ran for three Super Viernes shows with the finals on October 28, 2016. The CMLL Universal Championship is an annual tournament exclusively for wrestlers holding CMLL-recognized champions; first held in 2009, making the 2016 version the eight overall tournament. Being a professional wrestling tournament, it is not won legitimately; it is instead won via predetermined outcomes to the matches that is kept secret from the general public.

The 2016 tournament saw CMLL World Trios Champion Valiente defeat his regular Trios partner Volador Jr. in the finals of the tournament to win his first Universal Championship tournament.

Background
The tournament featured 15 professional wrestling matches under single-elimination tournament rules, which means that wrestlers would be eliminated from the tournament when they lose a match. All male "non-regional" CMLL champions at the time of the tournament are eligible to participate in the tournament. The CMLL World Mini-Estrella Championship and Mexican National Lightweight Championship are both exclusively for CMLL's Mini-Estrella division and thus not eligible for the tournament. Regionally promoted championships such as the CMLL Arena Coliseo Tag Team Championship and the Occidente championships promoted in Guadalajara, Jalisco have not been included in the tournament in the past; only titles that have been defended in CMLL's main venue Arena Mexico are normally included, although exceptions have been made to allow New Japan Pro-Wrestling (NJPW) champions to compete if they were in Mexico at the time. For the 2016 version of the tournament only 15 out of the 16 participants had competed in at least one Universal Championship tournament before, only Rey Cometa (the Mexican National Welterweight Champion) was a first time competitor. Atlantis (Mexican National Light Heavyweight Champion) and Último Guerrero (NWA World Historic Middleweight Champion) were the only former tournament winners to participate in the 2016 tournament. Mephisto's (CMLL World Welterweight Champion and Mexican National Trios Champion) participation made him the only wrestler to participate in seven out of the eight Universal Championship tournaments up until that point. Negro Casas (CMLL World Tag Team Champion), La Máscara (CMLL World Light Heavyweight Champion), Último Guerrero and Volador Jr. (NWA World Historic Welterweight Champion and CMLL World Trios Champion) all marked their sixth Universal Championship tournament. CMLL originally announced that Cavernario would be part of the tournament, despite having lost the Mexican National Welterweight Championship to Rey Cometa on June 10, 2016. They later corrected the participant list, replacing Cavernario with Rey Cometa.

Eligible champions

Tournament

References

2016 in professional wrestling
CMLL Universal Championship
October 2016 events in Mexico